Jackie Urbanovic is an American New York Times best-selling author and illustrator. The majority of her work consists of children's picture books, including her self-authored Max the Duck series. She regularly speaks at libraries and at other educational events for children. She is a member of the Children's Book Guild. She lives in Silver Spring, Maryland, where she has a studio for her work.

Career 
Urbanovic received a BFA from the Maryland Institute of Art. Her career started in graphic design and illustration, but realized she would prefer to illustrate children's literature. She studied writing under the mentorship of author Jane Resh Thomas in 1997 and after submitting her work to "Highlights" magazine, received her first trade illustration job on Spaghetti Eddie. Before she started her children's literature career, she contributed to several anthologies and comics series regarding LGBT themes and issues in the 1980s and 1990s. She is also credited as the Artist-In-Residence at the Molesworth Institute, a source of library humor and information.

Bibliography

Books

Self-authored and illustrated 

Do Your Ears Hang Low? (Sing and Read Storybook). Scholastic, 2005. 
Duck at the Door. HarperCollins, 2007. 
 Duck Soup. HarperCollins, 2008. 
 Duck and Cover. HarperCollins, 2009. 
 Sitting Duck. HarperCollins, 2010. 
 Ducks in a Row. HarperCollins, 2011. 
 Happy Go Ducky. HarperCollins, 2012. 
 Prince of a Frog. Orchard Books, 2015. 
 Splatypus. Two Lions, 2017.

Illustrated 

 Do the Hokey Pokey. Cricket Books, 2001. 
 Horace the Horrible. Marshall Cavendish Corp, 2003. 
 The Ten Best Things About My Dad. Cartwheel, 2004. 
 Bully Blockers Club. Albert Whitman & Company, 2004. 
 Grandma Lena's Big Ol' Turnip. Albert Whitman & Company, 2005. 
 Don't Squeal Unless It's a Big Deal. Magination Press, 2005. 
 Glamsters. Hyperion Book CH, 2008. 
 Spaghetti Eddie. Boyds Mills Press, 2009. 
 No Sleep for the Sheep! HMH Books for Young Readers, 2011. 
 If You're Hoppy. Greenwillow Books, 2011. 
 I've Lost My Hippopotamus. Greenwillow Books, 2012. 
 King of the Zoo. Orchard Books, 2013. 
 I Want Your Smile, Crocodile. Zonderkidz, 2018.

Contributions 

 Gay Comix #4, "A Word From Our Sponsor..."
 Wimmen's Comix  #14, "Losers in Love"
 StripAIDS USA
 Choices: A Pro-Choice Benefit Comic Anthology for the National Organization of Women
 Dyke Strippers: Lesbian Cartoonists from A to Z
 Men Are From Detroit, Women Are From Paris

References

External links 

 Official website

American women illustrators
American children's book illustrators
American women cartoonists
American LGBT artists
Year of birth missing (living people)
Living people
American cartoonists
21st-century American women